Armenian Liberal Party (Hayastani liberal kusakcut'yun) is a liberal political party in Armenia. The leader of the party is Hovhannes Hovhannisyan. The party was founded in 2008.

History
The party was a member of the Armenian National Congress between 2008 and 2012.

In 2014, Hovhannes Hovhannisyan announced that the Armenian Liberal Party signed a cooperation agreement with the Prosperous Armenia party.

The party did not participate in the 2018 Armenian parliamentary election.

Ideology
The party believes in strengthening human rights, fundamental freedoms, and creating a free market and competitive economic system in Armenia.

See also

 Programs of political parties in Armenia
 Politics of Armenia

References

2008 establishments in Armenia
Political parties established in 2008
Liberal parties in Armenia